SMTD may refer to:

 Sangamon Mass Transit District (SMTD), the public transit system of Springfield, Illinois, United States
 University of Michigan School of Music, Theatre & Dance (SMTD), an institution for the performing arts in the United States
 UNCG School of Music, Theater and Dance or SMTD, the former name of the College of Visual and Performing Arts, at the University of North Carolina at Greensboro
 Stockton Metropolitan Transit District (SMTD), original name of the San Joaquin Regional Transit District